Couva South is a parliamentary electoral district in the town of Couva.

Couva South consists of the southern part of Couva. It came into effect in time for the 1976 Trinidad and Tobago general election.

Members of Parliament
This constituency has elected the following members of the House of Representatives of Trinidad and Tobago:

Election results

Elections in the 2020s

Elections in the 2010s

See also
Couva North

References

 
Couva